Ľuboš Hanzel (born 7 May 1987) is a Slovak footballer who plays as a left-back for Austrian lower division club FC Illmitz.

Club career
Hanzel began his career in Spartak Trnava. In January 2008, he was loaned to Senec where he played eleven games, before returning to Trnava in July 2008. In summer 2009, he was linked with move to Copenhagen. On 13 August 2009, he moved to FC Schalke 04 on a half-year loan with option for two and a half additional years.

On 12 December 2009, Hanzel made his Bundesliga debut and replaced Jefferson Farfán in 90th minute in away match against Werder Bremen. After only one game for Schalke 04 he returned to Trnava in January 2010.

In January 2013, Hanzel joined Jagiellonia Białystok on a free transfer. He made his debut on 23 February 2013, playing the whole match in a 4–0 away defeat to Podbeskidzie Bielsko-Biała.

He joined Czech side Dukla Prague in February 2014, signing a half-year contract.

International career
On 6 June 2009, Hanzel made his international debut in the 2010 World Cup qualification win over San Marino. In the same match he scored his first international goal.

Personal life
His brother Tomáš Hanzel is currently playing for ŠK SFM Senec. He has one sister Dominika Hanzelová.

International goal

References

External links
 
 
 
 

1987 births
Living people
People from Trnava District
Sportspeople from the Trnava Region
Slovak footballers
Slovak expatriate footballers
Slovakia international footballers
Slovakia under-21 international footballers
Association football fullbacks
FC Spartak Trnava players
FC Senec players
FC Schalke 04 players
Jagiellonia Białystok players
FC Urartu players
FK Dukla Prague players
FK Iskra Borčice players
FKM Nové Zámky players
FK Slovan Duslo Šaľa players
Slovak Super Liga players
Bundesliga players
Ekstraklasa players
Czech First League players
Armenian Premier League players
2. Liga (Slovakia) players
3. Liga (Slovakia) players
Expatriate footballers in Germany
Expatriate footballers in Poland
Expatriate footballers in Armenia
Expatriate footballers in Austria
Slovak expatriate sportspeople in Germany
Slovak expatriate sportspeople in Poland
Slovak expatriate sportspeople in Armenia
Slovak expatriate sportspeople in Austria